Events in chess in 1915:

Chess events in brief
 Marshall Chess Divan started by Frank James Marshall. Forerunner to Marshall Chess Club.

Tournaments
 Triberg chess tournament won by Efim Bogoljubow ahead of Ilya Rabinovich and Peter Romanovsky, 1914/15
 New York (Metropolitan Chess League), won by Edward Lasker, January
 Vienna (Quadrangular), won by Józef Dominik, March
 25th London City championship (London, England), won by George Alan Thomas, March
 New York won by José Raúl Capablanca followed by Frank James Marshall, Oscar Chajes and Abraham Kupchik, Jacob Bernstein and Ed Lasker, 19 April – 7 May
 16th US Open Chess Championship (Excelsior, Minnesota),  won by Jackson Whipps Showalter ahead of Norman Tweed Whitaker, finished 21 August
 Utica won by Charles Jaffe
 Triberg won by Efim Bogoljubow ahead of Ilya Rabinovich and Alexander Flamberg
 Triberg won by Efim Bogoljubow ahead of Alexey Selezniev and Ilya Rabinovich
 Triberg won by Efim Bogoljubow of Ilya Rabinovich and Alexey Selezniev
 Moscow won by Nikolai Zubarev ahead of Peter Yurdansky
 St. Petersburg won by Alexander Ilyin-Genevsky and Golubev
 6th Danish Chess Championship (Horsens, Denmark), won by Johannes Giersing
 Amsterdam won by G.J. van Gelder
 Rotterdam won by G.J. van Gelder
 Scheveningen won by Max Marchand
 Hastings won by Reginald Price Michell
 7th Leopold Trebitsch Memorial Tournament (Vienna, Austria), won by Carl Schlechter followed by Richard Réti, Arthur Kaufmann, Georg Marco, František Schubert, and Ignatz von Popiel
 Moscow won by Alexander Alekhine ahead of Vladimir Nenarokov and Peter Yurdansky, December
 26th London championship (London, England), won by Theodor Germann and Edward Guthlac Sergeant, 1915/16
 Triberg (Triangular), won by Efim Bogoljubow ahead of Ilya Rabinovich and Alexey Selezniev, 1915/16

Matches
 17–20 May - Addey Dixon beat H. Thomas (+3 –1 =0) in Belfast.
  24 May - John O'Hanlon beat Addey Dixon (+3 –0 =0) in Portadown.
 Gyula Breyer won against Jan F. Esser (+2 –1 =1) in Budapest.
 Jacques Mieses defeated Siegbert Tarrasch (+1 –0 =1) in Berlin.
 Edward Guthlac Sergeant beat Theodor Germann (play-off) (+2 –0 =0) in London, 1915/16.

Births
 21 February - René Letelier in San Bernardo. Chilean ch. 1957, 1959, 1960, 1964, 1973, IM 1960.
 3 March - Kazimierz Plater born in Vilna. Polish ch. 1949, 1956, 1957. IM 1950.
 20 April - Maximilian Ujtelky born in Hungary/Slovakia. Slovak IM 1961.
 20 May - Erik Jakob Larsson born in Landskrona, Sweden.
 14 June - Nicolaas Cortlever, born in Amsterdam.  Dutch IM 1950.
 30 August - Hermann Albrecht, born in Marburg, Germany.  IJComp 1957.
 31 August - David Vincent Hooper, born in Reigate, England. British cr ch 1944.
 27 November - Shlomo Smiltiner, Israeli master.
 Edward Gerstenfeld born in Lviv. Polish-Ukrainian master.
 David Polland born in USA ? U.S. Open ch 1937 and NYS ch 1937.

Deaths
 Thomas Bright Wilson died of cholera.  Secretary of the Manchester Chess Club, England. He invented the first mechanical chess clock in 1883.
 Mattia Cavallotti died in Milan. Cavallotti Countergambit.
 Matteo Gladig died in Ljubljana. Italian master.
 19 March - Eugene Cook, died in Hoboken, NJ. 1st American composer of note.
 2 November - Isaac Rice, American inventor and chess patron, died in USA. Rice Gambit.

References

 
20th century in chess
Chess by year